Wonsees is a municipality in the district of Kulmbach in Bavaria in Germany.

City arrangement

Wonsees is arranged in the following boroughs:

 Feulersdorf
 Gelbsreuth
 Großenhül
 Kleinhül
 Lindenmühle
 Plötzmühle
 Sanspareil
 Schirradorf
 Wonsees
 Zedersitz

References

Kulmbach (district)